Alien Fashion Show is an American swing revival band, formed in Los Angeles in 1996. After being invited to perform as Brian Setzer's opening act during his Fall 1998 tour, the group signed to Surfdog, then Hollywood Records, and released their eponymous debut album in 1998. Also in 1998, the group drew attention when "Detroit Swing City" became the first-ever song to be released by a major record label as a free MP3 download. Reaction to this new method was generally mixed, but both the group and the label defended the approach, and other labels began adopting the release medium as well. 

The group's music went into rotation on multiple alternative and college radio stations around the United States, and they toured through 1999. In 2011, they self-released their second studio album, Cool Thing, and in 2019 released an EP titled Hellsville. Their work was also featured on multiple labels' swing revival compilations in the late 1990s.

History
The group was formed in Los Angeles in 1996 by Eldon Daetweiler, a singer and trumpeter; Daetweiler's brother Jeff, a drummer; Todd Thurman, a guitarist; Jeffrey Allen, a bassist and childhood friend of the Daetweilers; Steve "Shaman" Steinberg, original bassist, and Kenji "Woodchuck" Saito, a keyboardist. The Daetweilers had listened to music by Frank Sinatra, Jimmy Dorsey, and Glenn Miller as children, and been inspired by them to begin playing the trumpet and drums. Prior to forming the group, all had performed extensively in the LA club scene. 

Rockabilly and swing revival musician Brian Setzer heard some of the group's early recordings and invited them to perform as the opening act for his Fall 1998 tour. Setzer's manager subsequently signed them to Surfdog Records for the release of their debut full-length studio album. They recorded their debut album at two California studios: 4th Street Recording, in Santa Monica, and Village Recorder, in Los Angeles. Their eponymous debut album was released later that year, on July 28, 1998, and re-released by Hollywood Records. 

One of the tracks on the debut, "Detroit Swing City", was a swing-styled cover of the Kiss song "Detroit Rock City". On July 23, five days before the release of its parent album, Hollywood Records announced that it would be releasing the track for free online as a downloadable MP3 file. This made "Detroit Swing City" the first-ever song to be released in such a format by a major record label. Executives at the label expressed hope that the song's release would help to spread the band's name and boost sales of the album and concert tickets, especially given that they had no intention of formally releasing the song as a commercial single. The group shared these expectations, with Jeff Daetweiler arguing that "if they hear the single, people will hopefully buy the album. I think it has been a boon for us, really, rather than a hindrance. And I hope the rest of the industry starts to realize that." Hollywood Records' General Manager told Billboard at the end of 1998 that this decision drew criticism from some who were skeptical of the new format; however, in the following months, other major-label artists also began releasing their music as free MP3 files. The song had been downloaded more than 40,000 times by the summer of 1999. 

By February 1999, the group was also in rotation on some American college radio and alternative rock stations, including Maryville, Missouri's KDLX; Fort Lauderdale, Florida's WNSU; Jacksonville, Florida's WFIN; Rochester, New York's WIRQ; Sanborn, New York's WNCB; and St. Louis's KNSX. In 1999, the group performed with rock bands including the Goo Goo Dolls, and co-headlined the 25-date Freschetta Mirror Ball Tour in Spring of that year.

The group reunited in 2011 to release Cool Thing, a studio album consisting of re-recorded tracks from their 1998 debut in addition to some new material. In 2019, the group released an extended play, titled Hellsville; it was recorded at 4th Street Recording, the same Santa Monica studio at which they had recorded part of their debut album.

Musical style
Lead singer Eldon Daetweiler has stated that the group did not aim to be a "quote swing band", and that their objective was instead to imagine "What if Frank Sinatra grew up in the town of Twin Peaks or hung out with David Bowie?" Although classified as a swing band, the group has also been noted for the many other stylistic influences which they incorporate into their music, including surf, rockabilly, and trip-hop.

Personal lives 
It was reported that Eldon and Jeff Daetweiler lived together and hung a psychedelic portrait of Gene Krupa in their living room. In December 1997, Billboard reported that lead guitarist Todd Thurman and his wife, events marketing coordinator Judyth Springer-Thurman, had had a daughter, named Genevieve Dorothy. AFS Bassist Jeffrey Alan Dick passed away July 22, 2020.

Discography
 Alien Fashion Show (Surfdog/Hollywood, 1998)
 Cool Thing (Babsboys Music, 2011)

References

Works cited

External links
Official website
Archived version of the site (from 1999)
"I Had Breakfast with Aliens", a 1998 interview with the group from mp3.com

Rock music groups from California
Hollywood Records artists
Alien Fashion Show
Musical groups from Los Angeles
Swing revival ensembles